The Anglican Church of St Mary in Buckland St Mary, Somerset, England was built in 1853-1863. It is a Grade II* listed building.

History

The church was built between 1853 and 1863 by Benjamin Ferrey on the site of an earlier church.

The organ was built by Sweatland of Bath and in 1972 was repaired by Osmonds of Taunton. The tower was restored in 1966.

The parish is part of the Blackdown benefice within the Diocese of Bath and Wells.

Architecture

The stone building has hamstone dressings and a clay tile roof. It consists of a six-bay nave, chancel, four-bay north and south aisles and a south chapel. The nave has a hammerbeam roof. The beams of the roof are finely carved and there is a range of sculpture within the church.

The tower is supported by setback buttresses.

In the nave are statues of the 12 Apostles. The stained glass includes work by Clayton and Bell, Charles Eamer Kempe and Michael O’Connor.

See also  
 List of ecclesiastical parishes in the Diocese of Bath and Wells

References

Grade II* listed buildings in South Somerset
Grade II* listed churches in Somerset